The University of Mobile is a private, Baptist university in Mobile, Alabama. It is affiliated with the Alabama Baptist Convention (Southern Baptist Convention).

History 

The university was founded in 1961 by the Alabama Baptist State under the name of Mobile College. In 1993, the college was renamed the University of Mobile in reference to its location in Mobile County, not to be confused with the City of Mobile. For the 2018-2019 year, it had 1,885 students.

Accreditation 
It is affiliated with the Alabama Baptist Convention (Southern Baptist Convention).

Organization
The University of Mobile is governed by a board of trustees. Members are recommended by the president of the university, reviewed by the Committee on Boards at the Alabama Baptist State Convention, and appointed by the Alabama Baptist State Convention. Elected trustees serve 4-year terms with reelection possible up to a maximum of 12 continuous years, after which an individual must be off the board for at least one year before becoming eligible to return. Life trustees must have held an elected position on the board for 20 years and may then be presented by the president for election to the life position. As of April 2008, the university had 33 elected trustees and four life trustees.

Programs
 College of Arts and Sciences
 School of Business
 School of Christian Studies
 School of Education
 School of Nursing
 The Alabama School of the Arts

The University of Mobile has also established engineering partnership programs with Auburn University and the University of South Alabama by which students may receive a bachelor's degree from the University of Mobile and a bachelor's degree in engineering from the participating university.

Student life
The University of Mobile has 1,577 students from thirty states and twenty-four nations. Overall, sixty-five percent of the students enrolled are from the Mobile area or surrounding counties while seventeen percent are from other areas in Alabama. Forty percent of the student body reside on campus.  Sixty-five percent of the students are Southern Baptist.

Residential life
At its inception, Mobile College was entirely a commuter school until the first residence halls, Arendall and Bedsole Halls (originally named East and West Dorms, respectively), were completed. Along with Arendall and Bedsole, President Weaver also oversaw the addition of housing cottages, which would eventually be named Avery Woods. President Magnoli oversaw the addition of the university's fourth student housing unit, the 3-storied Ingram Hall. Under President Foley the university residential area expanded to include Samford Hall, Faulkner Hall, and the Timbers.

Athletics
The Mobile athletic teams are called the Rams. The university is a member of the National Association of Intercollegiate Athletics (NAIA), primarily competing in the Southern States Athletic Conference (SSAC; formerly known as Georgia–Alabama–Carolina Conference (GACC) until after the 2003–04 school year) since the 2010–11 academic year. The Rams previously competed in the Gulf Coast Athletic Conference (GCAC) from 1985–86 to 2009–10.

Mobile competes in 22 intercollegiate varsity sports: Men's sports include baseball, basketball, bowling, cross country, golf, soccer, tennis and track and field (indoor and outdoor); while women's sports include basketball, beach volleyball, bowling, cross country, golf, soccer, softball, tennis, track and field (indoor and outdoor) and volleyball; and co-ed sports include competitive cheer and spirit squad.

Overview
The university colors are garnet, black and gray, and a ram is the mascot. The school's intercollegiate program began in 1985 as one of the first acts of the newly appointed President Magnoli. The university has won national championships in men's tennis in 1993; women's tennis (1994); men's golf, men's tennis, and women's soccer in 1997; women's golf (1998); men's soccer (2002); and women's softball (2006).

Notable alumni
 Erin Bethea - actress
 Big Daddy Weave - members: Mike Weaver, Jeremy Redmon, Jeff Jones and Joe Shirk
 Gina DeVettori - actress
 Joe Espada - Major League Baseball coach, Houston Astros
 Sunny Mabrey - actress
 J. C. Romero - Former MLB baseball player and 2008 World Series Champion, Philadelphia Phillies, Minnesota Twins, Colorado Rockies, Los Angeles Angels of Anaheim, St. Louis Cardinals and Baltimore Orioles
 Saúl Rivera - Former MLB baseball player, Washington Nationals
 Remi Roy - Director of Scouting & Player Personnel, MLS New England Revolution
 Sarah Thomas - first woman to referee a Division I FBS NCAA football game, first permanent female NFL official, first woman to officiate an NFL playoff game, first woman to officiate a Super Bowl and any championship game of the major North American sports leagues. Played basketball for the Rams under her maiden name, Sarah Bailey. 
 Michael Azira - professional soccer player for the Colorado Rapids
 Miller Reese Hutchison - inventor of hearing aids and Klaxton horn, associate of Thomas Alva Edison.

See also

Southern Baptist Convention

References

External links
 
 Official athletics website

 
1961 establishments in Alabama
Baptist Christianity in Alabama
Council for Christian Colleges and Universities
Educational institutions established in 1961
Universities and colleges accredited by the Southern Association of Colleges and Schools
Universities and colleges affiliated with the Southern Baptist Convention
University of Mobile
Universities and colleges in Mobile, Alabama